Rain, Steam, and Speed – The Great Western Railway is an oil painting by the 19th-century British painter J. M. W. Turner.

The painting was first exhibited at the Royal Academy in 1844, though it may have been painted earlier. It is now in the collection of the National Gallery, London. The painting gives an impression of great speed in a static painting, an attribute that distinguished Turner from other artists. The work combines the power of nature and technology to create an emotional tension associated with the concept of the sublime.

Background 
The painting was painted close to the end of the Industrial Revolution, which brought a massive shift from an agrarian economy to one dominated by machine manufacturing in the Victorian Era. The railway was among the most potent symbols of industrialization, since this new way of transportation heavily affected industrial and social life. Turner seemed to be a generation ahead of other artists, as he was among the few painters at the time to consider industrial advancement as a commendable subject of art. The painting suggests that modern technology is a reality racing towards us.

The Great Western Railway (GWR) was one of a number of private British railway companies created to develop the new means of transport. The location of the painting is widely accepted as Maidenhead Railway Bridge, across the River Thames between Taplow and Maidenhead; a place that Turner had been exploring for over thirty years. The view is looking east towards London. The bridge was designed by Isambard Kingdom Brunel and completed in 1839.

Description 

Turner's painting illustrates an oncoming train in the countryside during a summer rainstorm. The train in the center is dark and rain-shrouded, surrounded by a golden natural landscape on both sides. However, the train and bridge, the solid elements of the painting, are barely hinted at, disappearing into the hazy and unreal atmosphere. The mist rising from the water, the rain that veils the sky, and the steam from the locomotive are blurred and mixed, unifying the painting's colors. In the lower-left corner of the painting, we can see a little person on a boat, making evident that the bridge is constructed on top of a river. In the bottom right of the painting, a hare runs along the track. Three white puffs of steam released by the engine into the air indicate that the train is in motion. The first, and nearest to the engine is the most distinct puff, while the other two gradually disappear in the horizon. For some, this detail expresses the idea of speed, as the puffs are progressively left behind. However they could equally well have been dispersed by the furious wind evident in the grey streaks painted across the viaduct.  In the interior of the train, Turner depicted a crowd of waving figures that served as a reminder that the railway was a festive and popular entertainment.

Artistic technique 
Turner frequently created an atmospheric tonality in his artistic creations by spreading the paint in short, broad brushstrokes from a filthy palette onto the canvas and gradually drawing forms out of his color ground. In the center of the painting and the upper right, Turner used thick impasto with a palette knife. To illustrate the rain, he dabbed dirty putty on to the canvas with a trowel, whereas the sunshine scintillates out of thick, smeary chunks of chrome yellow. Additionally, Turner used cool tones of crimson lake to illustrate the shadows and, even though the fire in the steam-engine appears to be red, it is most likely painted with cobalt and pea-green. Structurally, the picture has a balanced arrangement of forms with its firm geometrical elements.

Style and interpretation

Sublime 
This celebrated picture demonstrates Turner's commitment to classical landscape, as well as his passion for experimentation and interest in the modern world. The painting is interpreted as a celebration of travel and new technological power, with the railways representing the convergence of technology and natural forces. These elements create an emotional tension associated with the overwhelming power of the sublime. The thrilling essence of speed was an innovative factor of life, with the power to alter our emotions of nature, while the steam of the locomotive provided a groundbreaking atmospheric scenery. Turner was not painting a factual view of the Great Western Railway, but rather an allegory of the powers of nature and technology.

Hare 
A hare runs along the track in the bottom right of the painting, possibly symbolizing speed itself. Some think this is a reference to the limits of technology. Others believe the animal is running in fear of the new machinery and Turner meant to hint at the danger of man's new technology destroying the sublime elements of nature. Turner considered both hound and hare as the most characteristic emblems of speed, in which the hare does everything in its power to stay safe from the predator who chases it. In fact, he had used these symbols in previous works. In the 1810s, in Battle Abbey; the Spot Where Harold Fell, and later in 1837, in the Apollo and Daphne, he portrayed this detail of a hare being chased. A hare was likely to outpace a Great Western steam locomotive pulling a luggage train of open passenger wagons as depicted by Turner yet in Rain, Steam, and Speed, the modern observer might experience a feeling  the poor hare could be crushed in an instant. It is speculated that Turner, played on the idea of an animal chase, aware that a Great Western Firefly type of passenger locomotive engine was named Greyhound but his rendering of the engine is so indistinct to prevent any identification of its type and, in any case, fast and powerful Firefly locomotives were not allocated to luggage trains.

Analogues 
Some people interpret this painting as analogous to that of The Fighting Téméraire, since there seems to be a transition from the past towards the future as the train speeds towards us. Additionally, both paintings create a contrast between technology and the beautiful, peaceful landscape. Other interpretations say that at the left of the painting, Turner features a second stone bridge that serves as an analogue to the bridge in Apullia and Appullus of 1814, emphasizing that both principal structural elements have been pushed to the edges of the canvas.

See also 
 Trains in art

Notes

References

External links 

 National Gallery page on the painting.

1844 paintings
Arts in Berkshire
Collections of the National Gallery, London
Culture associated with the River Thames
Great Western Railway
Maidenhead
Paintings by J. M. W. Turner
Rain in art
Trains in art
Rabbits and hares in art
Bridges in art